Macroptila is a genus of moths in the subfamily Arctiinae. The genus was erected by Paul Dognin in 1894.

Species
 Macroptila antonia Dognin, 1911
 Macroptila crinada Dognin, 1894
 Macroptila elongata Reich, 1936
 Macroptila extensa Rothschild, 1912
 Macroptila fuscilaniata Hampson, 1914
 Macroptila laniata Dognin, 1899
 Macroptila monstralis Schaus, 1911
 Macroptila nebecula Schaus, 1911
 Macroptila rotundata Dognin, 1916

References

Lithosiini
Moth genera